Charles Bradley (December 1, 1902 – 1979) was a Rhode Island physician who was best known for the serendipitous discovery that the use of Benzedrine in children with behavior problems resulted in an improvement in their performance in a residential setting. Investigations leading from his work led directly to the current pharmaceutical treatment of ADHD.

Background
In 1887 Emma Bradley, a seven-year-old child, fell ill with encephalitis. Unlike most victims of the disease, she had access to the finest care of that era. Her father had assisted Alexander Graham Bell in the marketing of the telephone and had invested wisely. George and Helen Bradley were able to convert their estate in Pomfret, Connecticut into a hospital with a full-time doctor, nurses and other staff. They were unstinting in their efforts to obtain the finest advice and recommendations from major medical centers. Their efforts were in vain when at the age of 27, physically and mentally devastated by the disease, Emma Bradley died. Following the death of their only child, it was the family’s hope that future children might be helped. In 1932, following the provisions of their will, the nation’s first children’s psychiatric hospital was opened in East Providence, Rhode Island.

Discovery
Charles Bradley was the great nephew of George Bradley. As a pediatrician who had studied neurology during his residency at Babies Hospital in New York, he became the second director of the hospital. He conducted extensive, neurological workups on the patients at the facility. 
Included in the workup was pneumoencephalography, a study which often led to severe headaches which Dr. Bradley assumed, resulted from the loss of spinal fluid. In an attempt to stimulate the choroid plexus to produce spinal fluid he prescribed Benzedrine. 
It was noted by the teachers and nurses, whom cared for the children, that the patients who had received Benzedrine showed an improvement both in behavior and in academic performance. This was apparent even to the children, who began to call the medication “arithmetic pills” as a result of the improvement in their academic performance. Following these events Dr. Bradley published several works regarding the behavioral effects of Benzedrine. However, over 25 years passed before this class of drugs came into favor for the treatment of behavior problems in children.

Other contributions
Dr Bradley was also credited with the invention of a device to make pneumoencephalography in children easier and wrote extensively on childhood schizophrenia. He was also a leader in the use of residential treatment for children with behavioral problems.

References 

American pediatricians
Attention deficit hyperactivity disorder researchers
1902 births
1979 deaths